|}

The Christmas Hurdle is a Grade 1 National Hunt hurdle race in Great Britain which is open to horses aged four years or older. It is run at Kempton Park over a distance of about 2 miles (3,219 metres), and during its running there are eight hurdles to be jumped. The race is the second leg of the Triple Crown of Hurdling and is scheduled to take place each year during the King George VI Chase meeting on Boxing Day.

History
During the 1960s Kempton staged a 2-mile handicap race on Boxing Day called the Kempton Park Handicap Hurdle. Its winners included Salmon Spray and Saucy Kit – both subsequent winners of the Champion Hurdle. The race was abandoned in 1967 and 1968, and it returned in the guise of the Christmas Hurdle in 1969.

Six winners of the race in its present format have gone on to victory in the Champion Hurdle. The first was Lanzarote, the winner of the latter event in 1974, and the others are Dawn Run (1983–84), Kribensis (1989–90), Faugheen (2014–15), Epatante (2019–20) and Constitution Hill (2022–23).

Records
Most successful horse since 1969 (2 wins):
 Coral Diver – 1969, 1971
 Lanzarote – 1973, 1975
 Kribensis – 1988, 1989
 Intersky Falcon – 2002, 2003
 Harchibald – 2004, 2008
 Binocular – 2010, 2011
 Faugheen – 2014, 2015
 Epatante -  2019, 2021 

Leading jockey since 1969 (5 wins):
 Tony McCoy – Straw Bear (2007), Binocular (2010, 2011), Darlan (2012), My Tent Or Yours (2013)

Leading trainer since 1969 (11 wins):
 Nicky Henderson – Geos (2000), Landing Light (2001), Binocular (2010, 2011), Darlan (2012), My Tent Or Yours (2013), Buveur d'Air (2017), Verdana Blue (2018), Epatante (2019,2021), Constitution Hill (2022)

Winners since 1969

See also
 Horse racing in Great Britain
 List of British National Hunt races

References

 Racing Post:
 

 pedigreequery.com – Christmas Hurdle – Kempton.

External links
 Race Recordings 1983–2003 

National Hunt races in Great Britain
Kempton Park Racecourse
National Hunt hurdle races